Mogolla is a small, sometimes sweet, bread produced in the Andean region of Colombia, commonly hand-sized or smaller, with a round top and flat bottom.

Mogollas are usually made of wheat, whole wheat or corn meal combinations. One of the most famous versions is filled with pieces of pork rind, called Chicharron. Other versions are sweetened with caramel, honey or molasses and contain pieces of coconut or nuts.

References

Colombian cuisine
Breads